Barry Dwolatzky is a South African software engineer. He is a professor emeritus at the University of the Witwatersrand Joburg Centre for Software Engineering. Dwolatzky is on University of the People's computer science advisory board.

Education 
Dwolatzky completed a BSc(Eng) (1975) and Ph.D. (1979) in electrical engineering at University of the Witwatersrand. He was a postdoctoral researcher at the University of Manchester Institute of Science and Technology and GEC Marconi.

Career 
In 1989, Dwolatzky joined University of the Witwatersrand as a senior lecturer, becoming a full professor in 2000. He is an emeritus professor at the Joburg Centre for Software Engineering. Dwolatzky is on University of the People's computer science advisory board.

Dwolatzky is a fellow of the South African Institute of Electrical Engineers and The Institute of IT Professionals South Africa (IITPSA).

References

External links 
 
 

Living people
Year of birth missing (living people)
Place of birth missing (living people)
20th-century South African engineers
South African electrical engineers
Software engineers
21st-century South African engineers
University of the Witwatersrand alumni
Academic staff of the University of the Witwatersrand
University of the People faculty
South African computer programmers